The Turf Paradise Derby is an American Thoroughbred horse race held annually between early and mid February at Turf Paradise Race Course in Phoenix, Arizona. The race is open to three-year-old horses and is competed over a distance of one and one-sixteenth miles on the dirt.  An ungraded stakes that is an official prep race for the Kentucky Derby, it currently offers a purse of $100,000.

Inaugurated in 1986, the Turf Paradise Derby was run at a distance of one mile but the following year was modified to its present distance of one and one-sixteenth miles.

Records
Speed  record:
 1:41.72 – Startac (2001)

Most wins by a jockey:
 3 – Scott Stevens (1993, 2006, 2017)

Most wins by a trainer:
 5 – Doug Oliver (1989, 1990, 1991, 1992, 1995)

Most wins by an owner:
 2 – Alice Mettler (1989, 1990)
 2 – Allan Burdick (1991, 1992)
 2 – Arnulf & Rebecca Ueland (1991, 1992)
 2 – Dennis E. Weir (1996, 1999)

Winners of the Turf Paradise Derby

Ungraded stakes races in the United States
Horse races in the United States
Triple Crown Prep Races
Sports in Phoenix, Arizona
Recurring sporting events established in 1986
1986 establishments in Arizona